The Hamilton Red Wings were a junior ice hockey team in the Ontario Hockey Association from 1960 to 1974. The team was based in Hamilton, Ontario, at the Barton Street Arena, also known as the Hamilton Forum.

History
The Hamilton Tiger Cubs were renamed in 1960 becoming the Hamilton Red Wings as they wanted to gain increased ticket sales to emphasize the affiliation with the parent Detroit Red Wings which dated back to 1953. The team played for 14 seasons before being renamed the Hamilton Fincups as they had an ownership change as well as the partnership with Detroit was terminated in the late 60's.

The Red Wings of 1962 were coached by Eddie Bush, and managed by Jimmy Skinner (1954-55 Stanley Cup Champion Coach) . The team finished second overall in the OHA standings, then lost only 1 game in the post-season run to the Memorial Cup. In the playoffs Hamilton defeated the St. Catharines Teepees, Niagara Falls Flyers, and the Metro Jr. A. champs Toronto St. Michael's Majors 4 games to 1, winning the J. Ross Robertson Cup. The Red Wings then swept the series against the Quebec Citadelles for the George Richardson Memorial Trophy to win the Eastern Canadian Championship.

The Red Wings would play the Western Canadian champion Edmonton Oil Kings for the Memorial Cup. The first game of the 1962 Memorial Cup was played on home ice at the Barton Street Arena which Hamilton won 5-2. The next three games were played at the Guelph Memorial Gardens. Hamilton won game two 4-2. Edmonton won game three 5-3. Hamilton shutout Edmonton 3-0 in game four. The fifth and deciding game was played in the Kitchener Memorial Auditorium. The Red Wings defeated the Oil Kings 7-4 to win the series and the Memorial Cup, 4 games to 1.

Five years later the Red Wings made it to the OHA finals again in 1967, but were swept 4 games to 0 by the Toronto Marlboros.

Once the sponsorship money from the Detroit Red Wings ended at the conclusion of the 1966-67 season the franchise went in a free for all and owner Nick Durbano who had cash flow issues and little interest to maintain a competitive team. Durbano finally found a buyer in the summer of 1974.

Players
The two most famous Hamilton Red Wings alumni are "Little M" Pete Mahovlich, and 1972 Summit Series hero Paul Henderson. Many Hamilton Red Wings went on to play for the Detroit NHL team.

Award winners
1960-1961 - Bud Blom, Dave Pinkney Trophy, Lowest team GAA
1961-1962 - Pit Martin, Red Tilson Trophy, Most Outstanding Player
1961-1962 - Lowell MacDonald, William Hanley Trophy, Most Sportsmanlike Player
1962-1963 - Paul Henderson, William Hanley Trophy, Most Sportsmanlike Player
1964-1965 - Jimmy Peters, William Hanley Trophy, Most Sportsmanlike Player
1967-1968 - Jim Rutherford & Gerry Gray, Dave Pinkney Trophy, Lowest team GAA

NHL alumni

Yearly results
 Regular season

Playoffs
1960-61 Defeated Peterborough Petes 8 points to 2 in quarter-finals. Lost to St. Michael's Majors 9 points to 5 in semi-finals.
1961-62 Defeated St. Catharines Teepees 9 points to 3 in OHA semi-finals. Defeated Niagara Falls Flyers 8 points to 0 in OHA finals. Defeated St. Michael's Majors 8 points to 2 in all-Ontario finals. OHA CHAMPIONS Defeated Quebec Citadelles in Richardson Trophy playoffs. Defeated Edmonton Oil Kings 8 points to 2 in Memorial Cup finals. MEMORIAL CUP CHAMPIONS
1962-63 Lost to Niagara Falls Flyers 8 points to 2 in OHA semi-finals.
1963-64 Out of playoffs.
1964-65 Out of playoffs.
1965-66 Lost to Montreal Junior Canadiens 8 points to 0 in quarter-finals.
1966-67 Defeated Peterborough Petes 8 points to 4 in quarter-finals. Defeated Niagara Falls Flyers 8 points to 6 in semi-finals. Lost to Toronto Marlboros 8 points to 0 in finals.
1967-68 Defeated London Knights 8 points to 2 in quarter-finals. Lost to Kitchener Rangers 8 points to 4 in semi-finals.
1968-69 Lost to Montreal Junior Canadiens 8 points to 0 in quarter-finals.
1969-70 Out of playoffs.
1970-71 Lost to Ottawa 67's 9 points to 5 in quarter-finals.
1971-72 Out of playoffs.
1972-73 Out of playoffs.
1973-74 Out of playoffs.

References

Defunct Ontario Hockey League teams
Ice hockey teams in Hamilton, Ontario
1960 establishments in Ontario
1974 disestablishments in Ontario
Ice hockey clubs established in 1960
Ice hockey clubs disestablished in 1974